Bill Dunn (born 23 September 1967) is an Australian former professional rugby league footballer who played for Cronulla, Illawarra and the Western Suburbs.

Biography
A forward, Dunn played his football mostly as a second-row or prop. He went to high school in Tweed Heads and was an Australian Schoolboys representative player in 1985.

Dunn made only seven first-grade appearances during his time at Cronulla but received more regular games when he switched to Illawarra for the 1991 season. In 1992 his 22 first-grade games for Illawarra including three finals, culminating in a four-point preliminary final loss to St. George. He finished his career at Western Suburbs, where he played for four years.

In 1997, his final season, he made a representative appearance for NSW Country.

References

External links
Bill Dunn at Rugby League project

1967 births
Living people
Country New South Wales Origin rugby league team players
Cronulla-Sutherland Sharks players
Illawarra Steelers players
Rugby league players from Tweed Heads, New South Wales
Rugby league props
Rugby league second-rows
Western Suburbs Magpies players